Ropotovo is a village in the municipality of Dolneni, North Macedonia.

Demographics
Ropotovo appears in 15th century Ottoman defters as a village in the nahiyah of Köprülü. Among its inhabitants, a certain Nikolla Arbanas is recorded as a household head. The name Arbanas, is a medieval rendering for Albanian, indicating an Albanian presence in the village.

According to the 2021 census, the village had a total of 516 inhabitants. Ethnic groups in the village include:
Macedonians 487
Persons for whom data are taken from administrative sources 25
Albanians 2
Serbs 1
Others 1

References

Villages in Dolneni Municipality